Stan Durwood Stolte (born 1961) is an American baseball coach, currently serving as the head baseball coach at the University of Nevada, Las Vegas. Stolte attended college at Muscatine Community College and St. Ambrose University, where he played college baseball. Stolte served as an assistant baseball coach at the University of Nevada, Las Vegas, the University of Nevada, Reno, the University of the Pacific, Muscatine Community College, and Northwest Missouri State University. Stolte served as interim head coach at the University of Nevada, Las Vegas for the 2016 season, before being named permanent head baseball coach at UNLV on June 1, 2016.

Head coaching record

References

External links
 UNLV profile

1961 births
Living people
UNLV Rebels baseball coaches
Nevada Wolf Pack baseball coaches
Pacific Tigers baseball coaches
St. Ambrose Fighting Bees baseball players
Muscatine Cardinals baseball coaches
High school baseball coaches in the United States
Northwest Missouri State University alumni
Junior college baseball players in the United States